Urbanization in Pakistan has increased since the time of independence and has several different causes. The majority of southern Pakistan's population lives along the Indus River. Karachi is its most populous city. In the northern half of the country, most of the population lives in an arc formed by the cities of Lahore, Faisalabad, Rawalpindi, Islamabad, Gujranwala, Sialkot, Gujrat, Jhelum, Sargodha, Sheikhupura, Nowshera, Mardan and Peshawar. During 1990–2008, city dwellers made up 36% of Pakistan's population, making it the most urbanised nation in South Asia. Furthermore, 50% of Pakistanis live in towns of 5,000 people or more.

Historical causes of urbanisation

The British relinquished control of the colony in 1947 with the Great Partition of India and Pakistan, leaving the region in turmoil because of the vacuum of power, and the resulting mass migrations. The repercussions can still be seen today, as many still lack basic food and housing security in both India and Pakistan. Much of this was caused by the loss and destruction of property – and therefore capital and financial stability – during the migrations. Additionally, this rapid movement to and overcrowding of cities has led to the emergence of informal settlements, known as katchi abadis in Karachi.

Immigration, both from within and outside the country, is regarded as one of the main factors that have contributed to urbanisation in Pakistan. One analysis of the 1998 Pakistan Census highlighted the significance of the independence of Pakistan in 1947 in the 1940s in the context of understanding the urban change in Pakistan. During the independence period, Muslim Muhajirs from India migrated in large numbers and shifted their domicile to Pakistan, especially to the port city of Karachi, which is today the largest metropolis in Pakistan.

Migration from other countries, mainly those in the neighbourhood, has further catalysed the process of urbanisation in Pakistani cities. Of particular interest is migration that occurred in the aftermath of the independence of Bangladesh in 1971, in the form of stranded Biharis who were relocated to Pakistan. Smaller numbers of Bengalis and Burmese immigrants followed suit much later. The Soviet invasion in the 1980s forced millions of Afghan refugees into Pakistan, but most of them have been repatriated since 2002. Inevitably, the rapid urbanisation caused by these large population movements has also brought new political and socio-economic complexities.

In addition to immigration, economic events such as the Green Revolution and political developments, among a host of other factors, are also important causes of urbanisation.

Province wise
In 1998, 32.52% of Pakistani lived in Urban areas and has risen to 36.38% in 2017. In the 2017 censu , the Urbanization trend has increased in all administrative divisions of Pakistan except Islamabad Capital Territory, where it witnessed a sharp decline in Islamabad Capital Territory.In 1998, 65.72% of the population in Islamabad lived in urban areas and this dropped to 50.58% in 2017.

Sindh is the most urbanized province in Pakistan with 52.02% of its population living in urban areas. Sindh has seen an increase in Urbanization from 48.75% in 1998 to 52.02% in 2017.FATA is the least urbanised province with only 2.84% living in Urban areas

Effects of urbanisation on public health
With the proliferation of slums comes a plethora of related issues, such as public health, infrastructural, and sanitation issues. The infrastructure cannot support the population size, and in the rural areas, plumbing/wells/etc. often cannot be afforded, leading to water contamination. Many water sources are highly contaminated because of the lack of regulations and monitoring by the government. As a result, there is industrial waste and sewage contaminating water sources, as well as high fluoride and arsenic contents, which is further exacerbated by monsoon flooding, thus causing many epidemics throughout the years. Studies have shown that there are critically high levels of nitrates and chlorides in Karachi's water sources as well as other water-born pathogens causing diarrhea and loss of nutrients, exacerbating the existing problem of malnutrition. Specifically, 1 in 5 "street children" in Pakistan were shown to be stunted, and 1 in about 8 were wasted.

See also
 Timeline of Karachi
 Timeline of Lahore 
 Timeline of Peshawar
 List of most populous cities in Pakistan

References

 
Society of Pakistan